Brooklyn Joseph Peltz Beckham (born 4 March 1999) is an English media personality and former model. He is the eldest son of former England footballer David Beckham and English singer-turned-fashion influencer Victoria Beckham.

Early life
Beckham was born at the Portland Hospital in London, the son of David Beckham and Victoria Beckham. It is often reported he was named Brooklyn because he was conceived in Brooklyn, New York City. However, according to his mother's 2001 autobiography Learning to Fly, she and her husband simply liked the name. His mother recalled it was only after choosing the name they "realised how appropriate it was because it was in New York that she found out she was pregnant, and where David came after the World Cup."

Beckham spent his childhood in Madrid and Los Angeles, while his father played for Real Madrid and LA Galaxy. He has three younger siblings: brothers Romeo James, Cruz David, and a sister Harper Seven. In December 2004, Brooklyn and Romeo were jointly baptised in a private chapel on the grounds of their parents’ Hertfordshire mansion. His godparents are Elton John, David Furnish and Elizabeth Hurley.

At age 15, Beckham worked weekend shifts at a coffee shop in West London. Beckham played in the Arsenal F.C. Academy, but he left in 2015 after not receiving a scholarship to remain with the academy.

Career

Modeling
Beckham began modelling professionally in 2014, and has appeared in editorials and on covers for Vogue China, Miss Vogue, Interview, L'Uomo Vogue, T:The New York Times Style Magazine and Dazed Korea. He has been photographed by Bruce Weber, Terry Richardson, Daniel Jackson and Alasdair McLellan.

Beckham has been a brand ambassador for Huawei and its Honor 8 smartphones alongside Scarlett Johansson, Karlie Kloss and Henry Cavill.

In 2016, at age 16, Beckham photographed a campaign for Burberry BRIT, starring models Ben Rees, Carvell Conduah, Eliza Thomas, Liv Mason Pearson and Maddie Demaine. Beckham's hiring for the campaign was met with criticism by several prominent photographers. Chris Floyd called Burberry's decision to employ Beckham a "devaluation of photography" and "sheer nepotism", while fashion photographer Jon Gorrigan called it an example of "a bit of injustice in a lot of areas" of the industry.

Photography
In 2017, Beckham announced that he would pursue a photography degree at Parsons School of Design at the New School in New York. He failed to complete the first year of the four year course and subsequently abandoned his degree. Beckham's first book of photography, entitled What I See, was published in June 2017. Critical reactions were negative. A handful of leaked photographs became the focus of ridicule on Twitter, with users lampooning the "terrible photographs and even worse captions". However, Random House, Beckham's publisher, defended the book as reflecting the interests of his teenage fan base. Beckham returned to the UK and in 2019 interned for British photographer Rankin.

Cooking
In 2021, it was revealed that Beckham was to try his hand at becoming a professional chef. His online video series Cookin’ With Brooklyn attracted criticism when it was revealed that it took 62 professionals to create each episode, at a reported cost of $100,000 per episode. Critics also pointed out that Beckham has no real professional experience or training.

Personal life
Beckham previously dated American actress Chloë Grace Moretz, French-Tunisian model-singer Sonia Ben Ammar, Canadian model Lexi Wood, singer Madison Beer, dancer Lexi Panterra, Lottie Moss (sister of model Kate Moss), model Phoebe Torrance, singer Rita Ora, and English model Hana Cross. He attended the 2016 Democratic National Convention with Moretz in support of Hillary Clinton. After breaking up and reconciling several times, Moretz confirmed that she and Beckham had broken up for good in 2018.

After confirming their relationship on Instagram in January 2020, Beckham announced his engagement to American actress Nicola Peltz on 11 July 2020. The couple were married on 9 April 2022 in Palm Beach, Florida in a Jewish ceremony (his great-grandfather was Jewish and Peltz's father is Jewish).

He has a Hebrew tattoo of a line from the Song of Songs on his left arm: "I am my beloved's and my beloved is mine".

References

David Beckham
Victoria Beckham
1999 births
Living people
English male models
English people of Jewish descent
English people of German descent
English photographers
English expatriates in the United States
Parsons School of Design alumni
Photographers from London
Models from London
People from Marylebone
Peltz family